Rice plate may refer to:

 Rice Plate (2007 film), a film by Rohit Roy

Food
 List of rice dishes
 Thali, a Nepalese and Indian food
 碟頭飯 (rice dish), served at dai pai dong

See also
 Rice (disambiguation)
 Plate (disambiguation)